Choreutis achyrodes is a moth of the family Choreutidae. It is known from China (Guangxi, Guizhou, Taiwan), Japan (Shikoku, Kyushu, Ryukyu Islands), India
(Assam) and the Oriental region.

The wingspan is 10–15 mm.

The larvae feed on Ficus wightiana.

References

External links
Japanese Moths

Choreutis
Moths of Asia
Moths of Japan
Taxa named by Shōnen Matsumura
Moths described in 1912